is a 51 episode Japanese anime television series, and the first series produced for the Eldran franchise funded by Tomy and produced by Sunrise. It aired in Japan from April 3, 1991 to March 25, 1992. The story revolves around a group of elementary school children who are given command of a mecha named Raijin-Oh and their efforts to defend the Earth from the evil Jaaku (evil) Empire. There is also a four-episode OVA sequel.

Anime Midstream, Inc. announced in December, 2008, that it acquired the license for and planned to release the anime series Matchless Raijin-Oh in the U.S. sometime in 2009 as their first anime release.  The company began selling the first volume of the series direct from their website, as well as several other online retailers as of late December 2009. The first volume contained episodes 1–5. The second volume, containing episodes 6–10, was released in September 2010, and translated the title beginning with this volume (and current printings of the first volume are now also marketed under that title). The third volume was released on July 12, 2011, containing episodes 11–15. Each volume contains English and Japanese audio, as well as special features such as music videos, clean openings/closings, voice bloopers, and the third volume contains an audio commentary with several of the English voice actors. Two more volumes were released on June 30, 2012 for volume four and July 1, 2013 for volume five.

The rest of the series was released as a five-disc boxset; the Season 2 Collection, released on September 30, 2014. However, this set is in Japanese with English subtitles only.

Plot
Prior to Ganbaruger arriving to Earth, an evil organisation which was named the  comes to Earth with the intent to conquer and despoil it.

The "guardian of light" Eldran appears, an Ultraman-like entity who is sworn to protect the universe and Earth in particular then appears. Using the heroic robot Raijin-Oh, Eldran attempts to thwart the Evil Empire by preventing a missile from striking Earth. What happens instead is that the missile detonated against Eldran, throwing Raijin-Oh down to Earth. The robot crashes into Japan's Hinobori city(), elementary school Hinobori School.

Eldran must leave to continue protecting the Earth, so he leaves the duty of defeating the Evil Beasts to a 5th grade classroom full of children,  in the school where he crashed. He entrusts the children with Raijin-Oh, granting each child a different role to perform in either operating or supporting Raijin-Oh. Eldran also transforms their school itself, so it can transform into a command center when Raijin-Oh is needed.
Jin, Asuka and Kouji are chosen to lead Raijin-oh, but every day they have many amusing experiences in the school. Jin does not want to study, while his friends do and force him to do it by tickling him.

Characters

Jin Hyuga is a leader in Earth Defense Class, the main pilot of Ken-oh and Raijin-Oh and God Raijin-Oh. He is brash, a braggart, and very good at sports. He has spiky hair, is boss of the kids, and has a strong sense of justice. His student number is the eighth. He often quarrels with Maria, but they trust each other. His parents run a sake shop, the Hyuga Store.

Asuka Tsukishiro is the main pilot of Hou-oh, and flight and altitude controller for Raijin-Oh, God Raijin-Oh. He is a handsome, smart, rich, realist, but a vain and timid boy. He is very popular with girls in the class, and has his own fan club. His student number is seventh. Hiryu Tsukishiro is his cousin, who is the pilot of Ryu-Oh.

Koji Hoshiyama is the main pilot of Jyu-oh, also the power controller for both Raijin-Oh and God Raijin-Oh, and all-weapon controller. He is kind-hearted, timid but courageous, has a pair of binoculars, and he believes in UFOs and aliens. His student number is ninth.

Maria Shiratori is a commander in the Earth Defense Class, and the main pilot of Bakuryu-oh. She is smart, strong-willed, daring, has a ponytail, and is half Japanese and half French.

Tsutomu Kojima is the advisor in the Earth Defense Class, and computer operator. Tsutomu is a smart, polite, stubborn, and a typical nerd with bobbed hair and thick glasses who likes to study and research. He has done an analysis of the robots of Eldran. The mad scientist of the Saurers, Takako Kojima is Tsutomu's relative and cousin, who he respects her.

Kirara Haruno is mainly an operator with the outside. Kirara is an honest, frank, fluffy long-haired girl, and is a broadcasting committee member. She wants to be a newscaster, and is Asuka's fan club president.

Akira Imamura is an operator of core robots's starting system and weapon selector of Bakuryu-oh. Akira is a pretentious sore loser and a punk boy who wants to be a rock star, and had put the mesh in his hair.

Reiko Ikeda is mainly an operator with Raijin-Oh. Reiko is a lively, curious, big almond-shape eyed girl who is a big wrestling fan, and she troubled with the fact that she's the shortest student in the class. She is in love with Tsutomu.

Miki Mano is the energy gauge manager, launcher of Bakuryu Cutter fire, and safety manager of Bakuryu-oh's weapons. Miki is diligent, but quickly gives up, and is a member of the breeding committee.

Hiroshi Takamori is a vice-commander in the Earth Defense Class, safety manager of Raijin-Oh's weapons, and sub pilot of Bakuryu-oh. Hiroshi is the male representative of the class, and is usually inconspicuous, but trusted. He's in love with Cookie, his childhood friend.

Orie Ishizuka, known as "Potato", is Hou-oh's all sensor systems monitor, and Raijin-oh's damage counter. Orie is a generous, strong-willed, chubby girl who loves potato chips.

Yoko Kuriki, known as "Cookie", is Raijin-oh's radar operator. Cookie is a short, big-eyed girl who likes adorable things, but has strong dependence on others and can't do anything on her own. Her own teddy bear turns into an evil beast in episode 11.

Yoshiaki Ogawa, known as "Yoppa" is Ken-oh's circuit-based monitor, and Bakuryu-oh's transformation manager. 'Yoppa' is an own-pacer, lacking in cooperation, fat boy with spiky hair, who's somehow lovable.

Tokie Sakai is Jyu-oh's sensor systems monitor, and Bakuryu-oh's damage counter manager. Tokie wears overalls, meddles, and likes super heroes. She became friends with Osekkaizar, the evil beast from episode 36.

Hidenori Kondo is Raijin-oh's radar operator. Hidenori is a super-rich, small, kind-hearted, polite, shy boy.

Daisuke Sato is Ken-oh's circuit system monitor, launcher of Bakuryu Cannon fire, and main mechanic of robots. Daisuke is the tallest and biggest student in the class, but a gentle, shy boy, and the eldest son of large family.

Yu Izumi is a commander in Earth Defense Class, and main pilot of Bakuryu-oh. Yu is sickly, shy, timid, and has braided hair. She is the tallest girl in the class.

, Rica Matsumoto(since episode 37)
Aiko Shimada, known as "Love" is Ken-oh's sensors system monitor, and Bakuryu-oh's pulse checker. Aiko is a mature, tall girl who is good at sports, and is a physical education committee member.

Other

The 25-year-old Homeroom teacher of 5th Grade Class 3 in Hinobori Elementary School, known as the Earth Defense Class. Mr. Shinoda is a young passionate teacher who loves the students, but he has often been disturbed a lesson by Evil Beasts. 

A 23 year old kind, beautiful public health doctor in Hinobori Elementary School. Mr. Shinoda has a crush on her.

The 65-year-old principal of Hinobori Elementary who is a good supporter for 5th Grade Class 3. he's master of Tai Chi, also adviser of Kenpo club. He has a pet goat that is named Carol.

General of the Defense forces. He had objected to the children fight but cooperates with them later. In Genki Bakuhatsu Ganbaruger, he has a daughter who went by the name of Katsura.

Eldran is Earth's guardian. 400 years ago prior to Raijin-Oh, Ganbaruger, Gosaurer and Daiteioh's appearances, Eldran has sealed Gokuark and had been fighting against Gokuark but it results into transforming into a white dragon at the demon world. He is the warrior of light who gave Raijin-oh to the Earth Defense Class in order to defeat the Evil Empire. He also later gives out Ganbaruger in Aozora, Gosaurer in Harukaze and Daiteioh in Gokuraku as the years progress one by one.

Ruler of the Jark Empire, that exists in the five dimensions.

Commander in Jark Empire, also main pilot of Jark Satan. Belzeb is a handsome, quick temper, strict warrior with long purple hair. The creatures in five dimension are able deform their own bodies like the amoeba, and have the power of teleportation.

Belzeb's Alter ego, Falzeb is small woman look-like fairy with silver-haired and kimono. living in sub-space in Belzeb's chest, Falzeb turns devil face at the time irradiation the Jark Power.

, Mahito Tsujimura(since episode 39)
Belzeb's subordinates. Taidar is a happy-go-lucky, leisurely, faithfulness, bearded plump man with punk fashion. He often gets an outburst of anger from Belzeb and Falzeb. Taidar is hired at Hyuga Store later, he appeared as a minor character also Genki Bakuhatsu Ganbaruger frequently.

Appears at the OVA, a new evil guy from Jark Empire.

The Robots

Specs
Height: 15.4 meters
Weight: 10.0 tons
Top Speed: 420 kilometers per hour
Power Output: 

Ken-Oh (literally "Sword King") is a humanoid robot, piloted by Jin, the leader of the trio. It has a sword called the Ken-Oh Blade, which protrudes from the shield on Ken-Oh's back when needed. It forms the torso of the Raijin-Oh.

Specs
Length: 35.7 meters
Weight: 15.5 tons
Ground Movement Speed: 80 kilometers per hour
Top Flying Speed: Mach 9
Power Output: 

Hou-Oh (literally "Phoenix King") resembles a phoenix. It is piloted by Asuka, and is the fastest of the trio. Hou-Oh forms the arms and wings of Raijin-Oh.

Specs
Length: 30.5 meters
Weight: 28.5 tons
Top Speed: 640 kilometers per hour
Power Output: 

Juu-Oh's (literally "Beast King") appearance is that of a lion, and is controlled by Kouji. It forms the legs of the Raijin-Oh and the lion head is used as a shield which contains the Raijin Sword. Juu-Oh is the strongest of the trio.

Specs
Height: 25 meters
Weight: 54 tons
Ground Movement Speed: 880 kilometers per hour
Top Flying Speed: Mach 10
Power Output: 

Raijin-Oh （literally thunder god king）is the first Eldran robot before Ganbaruger was the second. If the enemy becomes too powerful for the trio to handle individually, all three robots will combine, and they form into Raijin-Oh, a large humanoid robot with wings. In the early parts of the series, Raijin-Oh will trap its opponent with a beam from the Raijin Shield and finish it off with the Raijin Sword.

Specs
Length: 58 meters
Weight: 70 tons
Ground Movement Speed: 130 kilometers per hour
Top Flying Speed: Mach 20
Power Output: 

After the evil commander Belzeb (short for Beelzebub or Satan) was given a giant crystal robot named Jaaku Satan by Emperor Warza (literally "evil emperor") to assists the Jaaku Beasts in destroying Raijin-Oh, the Raijin-Oh soon realized that it was unable to defeat its enemies alone. At the brink of defeat, the Earth Defense Class managed to uncover one last robot, Bakuryu-Dragon bears the appearance of a dragon but can transform into a humanoid robot, Bakuryu-Oh.

Specs
Height: 27.5 meters
Weight: 62 tons
Ground Movement Speed: 800 kilometers per hour
Top Flying Speed: Mach 14
Power Output: 

Bakuryu-Dragon's humanoid form.
As strong as Raijin-oh, its arsenal includes a cannon and a shield.

Specs
Height: 41 meters
Weight: 116 tons
Ground Movement Speed: 1,200 kilometers per hour
Top Flying Speed: Mach 22
Power Output: 

The Raijin-Oh and Bakuryu-Oh can further combine to form the ultimate robot, God Raijin-Oh. In the early parts of its appearance, God Raijin-Oh finishes off Jaaku Beasts with a cannon. Soon after the God Raijin-Oh Sword is discovered and is used since then to defeat Super Jaaku Beasts (Jaaku Satan combined with a powered-up Jaaku Beast).

Cultural impact
Raijin-Oh was a tremendously popular series at the time of its release, spawning two similar sequels and OVAs. This led to waves of similar TV shows in the early 90s, where a child or children were made into the pilots of giant robots. This was a significant change of pace for the mecha genre, which usually pursued an older demographic and used teenage or adult characters as pilots.

Raijin-Oh success would inspire future shows like Gear Fighter Dendoh, Machine Robo Rescue, Tomica Hyper Rescue Drive Head Kidō Kyūkyū Keisatsu, and Shinkansen Henkei Robo Shinkalion. The spiritual successors contain many plot elements that directly similar to Raijin-Oh's premise, characters, but, with the exception of not having a school to house the robots or an Eldran-like being to create them. Otherwise, Raijin-Oh had little worldwide impact, despite some success in Southeast Asian countries like China and Taiwan.

Raijin-Oh was featured in the New Century Brave Wars game, along with several of the Yuusha series robots, also created by Sunrise at around the same time. The reason for this was likely to have been the similarities between the Yuusha series and the Eldran trilogy, that and both series were animated by Sunrise. The toy company which made the Yuusha series, Takara would later merge with Tomy and thus both companies had access to each other's toy ideas, hence why Raijin-Oh was part of the video game. However the other two Eldran series, Genki Bakuhatsu Ganbaruger and Nekketsu Saikyo Go-Saurer were not included; in fact, a few of the Yuusha series robots were also left out of the game. Raijin-oh, Ganbaruger, and Gosaurer may have been included in the Brave Saga New Asteria game.

Raijin-Oh has appeared in several installments of Banpresto's Super Robot Wars series of games. It has appeared in Super Robot Wars GC and its remake, Super Robot Wars XO, Super Robot Wars NEO, and Super Robot Wars BX. This is in part due to the fact that the Super Robot Wars series largely concerned itself with '70s and '80s series at the time the game series began in the early '90s. As of 2009, Raijin-Oh is nearly 20 years old and therefore old enough to be nostalgic to adult gamers. It is not clear why Raijin-Oh had only appeared in the 3D Super Robot Wars games that appear on Nintendo consoles, as opposed to the more popular 2D games that appear on PlayStation systems and Nintendo handhelds until the release of BX.

Episode list

OVA List (Genki Bakuhatsu Ganbaruger Saga)

Game Appearances
The series first appeared on Sunrise Eiyuutan for the Dreamcast. Later on, it was included on Super Robot Wars GC for the Nintendo GameCube and again in Super Robot Wars XO for the Xbox 360.

Raijin-Oh is again included as an entry in the Super Robot Wars series of video games, beginning with Super Robot Wars NEO for the Wii along with the other 3 Eldran robots.

It also appeared in New Century Brave Wars on the PlayStation 2 in Japan to establish the first official connection between the Eldran and Yuusha series, following the merger of Takara and Tomy.

It would later appear as one of the various Sunrise animated robots as a playable character in the RPG Battle of Sunrise, to celebrate the studio's 30th anniversary, released on the PlayStation 2.

There also exists a Game Boy fighting game published by Tomy in 1991, which has been translated into English through a fan-made patch.

Raijin-Oh, once again, is included in the Super Robot Wars series in Super Robot Wars OE and Super Robot Wars BX. BX is notable to be the first time Raijin-Oh appeared in a 2D Super Robot Wars game.

External links and references
Eldran's official website (Japanese)
Sunrise's introduction page(Japanese)

foxdragon's introduction page 

1991 anime television series debuts
Bandai Namco franchises
Children's manga
School life in anime and manga
Sunrise (company)
Eldran series
TV Tokyo original programming
Super robot anime and manga
Tomy games
Super Robot Wars
Television series set in fictional countries